The 2020–21 Southern Jaguars basketball team represented Southern University in the 2020–21 NCAA Division I men's basketball season. The Jaguars, led by third-year head coach Sean Woods, played their home games at the F. G. Clark Center in Baton Rouge, Louisiana as members of the Southwestern Athletic Conference.

Previous season
The Jaguars finished the 2019–20 season 17–15, 13–5 in SWAC play to finish in second place. They defeated Alabama State in the quarterfinals of the SWAC tournament, and were set to face Texas Southern in the semifinals until the tournament was cancelled amid the COVID-19 pandemic.

Roster

Schedule and results 

|-
!colspan=12 style=| Non-conference regular season

|-
!colspan=9 style=| SWAC regular season

|-
!colspan=12 style=| SWAC tournament
|-

|-

Source

References

Southern Jaguars basketball seasons
Southern Jaguars
Southern Jaguars basketball
Southern Jaguars basketball